Willow Brook is a tributary of Utley Brook in Susquehanna County and Wyoming County, in Pennsylvania, in the United States. The surficial geology in the vicinity of the stream consists mainly of Wisconsinan Till, bedrock, alluvium, wetlands, and a lake. A number of bridges have been constructed across it. The stream is classified as a Coldwater Fishery and a Migratory Fishery.

Course
Willow Brook begins in Clark Pond in Lenox Township, Susquehanna County. It flows west-southwest for a short distance before entering a wetland. Here, it turns south-southeast, receiving an unnamed tributary from the right, passing through a small, unnamed pond, and leaving the wetland. The stream continues flowing in a generally south-southeasterly direction for more than a mile, receiving an unnamed tributary from the left in the process. The stream then turns south for several tenths of a mile. An unnamed distributary branches off from the left and Willow Brook enters a wetland. It then turns south-southwest for several tenths of a mile, entering another wetland, where it receives an unnamed tributary from the right. It then turns south for a few tenths of a mile before turning south-southeast, passing through a small wetland and entering Nicholson Township, Wyoming County. Several tenths of a mile further downstream, the stream reaches its confluence with Utley Brook.

Geography and geology

The surficial geology near the mouth of Willow Brook includes alluvium (which contains stratified silt, sand, and gravel), a till known as Wisconsinan Till, and bedrock consisting of sandstone and shale. Further upstream, the surficial geology in the area mostly consists of Wisconsinan Till, but there are large patches of bedrock consisting of sandstone and shale, smaller patches of alluvium and wetland, and a lake.

Watershed and biology
The mouth of Willow Brook is in the United States Geological Survey quadrangle of Lenoxville. However, its source is in the quadrangle of Hop Bottom.

Willow Brook is classified as a Coldwater Fishery and a Migratory Fishery.

History
Willow Brook was entered into the Geographic Names Information System on August 2, 1979. Its identifier in the Geographic Names Information System is 1191497.

In 2014, a bridge replacement operation was carried out for a bridge carrying State Route 2019 (Schoolhouse Road) over the stream in Lenox Township, Susquehanna County. In August 2014, the completion of this project was scheduled for October 2014.

In 2013, Chief Oil & Gas LLC was issued an Erosion and Sediment Control permit for which the receiving waterbodies are Willow Brook and one of its unnamed tributaries.

See also
List of rivers of Pennsylvania

References

Rivers of Susquehanna County, Pennsylvania
Rivers of Wyoming County, Pennsylvania
Tributaries of Tunkhannock Creek
Rivers of Pennsylvania